Firmin Massot (5 May 1766, in Geneva, Republic of Geneva – 16 May 1849, in Geneva, Switzerland) was a Swiss portrait painter.

Biography 
His father was a master watchmaker. He began his studies in 1778 at the "School of Drawing", then attended classes at the "", where he studied with Jean-Étienne Liotard, among others. A trip to Italy from 1787 to 1788 had a lasting effect on his style. He had his first showing in 1789 at the Salon of Geneva, where he presented an Étude d'après nature (Study from Nature). At the next Salon, he won the Grand Prize. In 1794, he was invited to Lausanne to work for Madame de Staël.

In 1799, he was named Director of the "Écoles de dessin de la ville de Genève" and, the following year, became a member of the art society. From 1807 to 1813, he travelled throughout France, making contacts with fellow artists. From 1828 to 1829, he toured England and Scotland, receiving many commissions along the way and becoming enamored of the English "conversation pieces". He also favored a style known as "jusqu'aux genoux" (as far as the knees).

After 1820, he eschewed detailed backgrounds in favor of simple tones that emphasized the face. Until then, however, many of his portraits were done in collaboration with the landscape painter Wolfgang-Adam Töpffer and the animal painter Jacques-Laurent Agasse. Created mostly for wealthy patrons, Massot would paint the figures while his associates would fill in the backgrounds with various props that symbolized the sitter. Perhaps because of this, very few of his paintings are signed and attribution is often difficult. It is believed that approximately 250 works are authentically his.

Many prominent women were among his sitters, including Madame Recamier, the Empress Josephine and Queen Hortense. His sister Pernette was also a painter and engraver and is sometimes cited as his first teacher.

References

Further reading
 Daniel Baud-Bovy, Peintres genevois: 1766–1849 (deuxième série) Töppfer, Massot, Agasse, Le Journal de Genève, 1904
 Valérie Louzier-Gentaz, Firmin Massot (1766–1849), Editions Chênoises, 1995

External links 

 ArtNet: More works by Massot
 Plumes Genevoise: "Les peintres genevois entre le 18ème et le 20ème siècle Part VII: Firmin Massot (L’art à l’ancienne)"

1766 births
1849 deaths
Artists from the Republic of Geneva
Swiss male painters
Swiss portrait painters
19th-century Swiss painters
19th-century Swiss male artists